Church Cemetery, also known as Rock Cemetery, is a place of burial in Nottingham, England which is Grade II* listed. It is situated at the south-east corner of Forest Recreation Ground.

History
Church Cemetery was founded in 1848 and was designed by Edwin Patchitt, clerk to the County Magistrates. Fundraising started in 1851 and 181 shareholders represented a contribution of 959 £5 shares. The tenancies for the land were arranged in 1853 and it was not finished when it opened in 1856. A church was included in the design, which gave the cemetery its name, but this was not built at the time of its opening. The construction works involved the removal and relocation of some 20,000 tons of earth and the laying out of paths and suitable planting including Cedars of Lebanon.

It was consecrated by the Bishop of Lincoln, Right Revd John Jackson on 18 June 1856 

A mortuary chapel to the designs of the architect Edward William Godwin  opened on 14 August 1879. The fittings were of varnished pitch pine, with accommodation for about 120 people. A bell turret surmounted the chapel, and in the archway through which mourning coaches passed, there was a waiting room. The cost of the chapel was £2,600, and the contractors were Messrs. Bradley and Barker. It was demolished in 1965

A war memorial designed by Sir Reginald Blomfield was added in 1920 and is Grade II listed. The cemetery contains the scattered war graves of 81 Commonwealth service personnel of World War I and 20 of World War II.

Nottingham City Council took over responsibility in 1965.

Notable interments
Thomas Adams (manufacturer and philanthropist) 1873
Marriott Ogle Tarbotton engineer 1887
Edwin Patchitt 1888
Anthony John Mundella MP 1897
Philip James Bailey poet 1902
Hedley John Price architect 1905
Samuel Waite Johnson railway engineer 1912
William Arthur Heazell architect 1917
Arthur Clamp footballer 1918 - one of the war graves in the cemetery.,
Watson Fothergill architect 1928

References

1848 establishments in England
Nottingham
Nottingham
Grade II* listed buildings in Nottinghamshire
Nottingham
Parks and open spaces in Nottinghamshire